Paul J. Wahlbeck is an American political scientist, lawyer, and academic administrator. He has served as the dean of the Columbian College of Arts and Sciences since 2020. He is a professor of political science. 

Wahlbeck completed a B.A. in political science at Wheaton College in 1983. He earned a J.D. at the University of Illinois Urbana-Champaign in 1986. He completed a Ph.D. in political science at the Washington University in St. Louis in 1993.

Selected works

References 

Living people
Year of birth missing (living people)
Place of birth missing (living people)
Wheaton College (Illinois) alumni
University of Illinois Urbana-Champaign alumni
Washington University in St. Louis alumni
Columbian College of Arts and Sciences faculty
21st-century American lawyers
American political scientists
21st-century political scientists
21st-century American scientists
American university and college faculty deans